Bosnia and Herzegovina uses a single time zone, denoted as Central European Time (CET: UTC+01:00). It also observes summer time, shifting to Central European Summer Time (CEST: UTC+02:00).

The shift to Daylight Saving Time (DST) occurs on the date as specified for the European Summer Time since 1983, when the system was introduced in the former SFR Yugoslavia.

IANA time zone database
The IANA time zone database contains one zone for Bosnia and Herzegovina in the file zone.tab, named Europe/Sarajevo.

References

Time by country